Prizrenac may refer to:
Prizrenac (fortress), a fortress southwest of Novo Brdo
Višegrad (Bistrički), a fortress southwest of Prizren